The second 1946 United Nations Security Council election was held on 19 November 1946 during the First session of the United Nations General Assembly. The General Assembly elected Belgium, Colombia, and Syria, as the three new non-permanent members of the UN Security Council for two-year mandates commencing in January 1947.

Result

The election was managed by the then-President of the United Nations General Assembly Paul-Henri Spaak of Belgium. On this date, the United Nations had 54 member states, Afghanistan, Iceland, and Sweden having been welcomed to the organization earlier during the same meeting (for a timeline of UN membership, see Enlargement of the United Nations). The election was done using a list of United Nations member states. From the list the eight current members of the Security Council were removed (the Permanent Five and Australia, Brazil, and Poland) and also the three members that could not stand for immediate re-election (Egypt, Mexico, and the Netherlands). Heads of delegations were asked to mark with a cross the square opposite the name of each member for whom they wished to vote. Voting was conducted on a single ballot. Ballots on which more than three states were marked were invalidated.

See also
List of members of the United Nations Security Council

References

External links
UN Document A/59/881 Note Verbale from the Permanent Mission of Costa Rica containing a record of Security Council elections up to 2004

1946 elections
1946,11
Non-partisan elections
1946 in international relations
Security Council election,11